Wilmington Area High School  is a public school in New Wilmington, Pennsylvania, that teaches grades 9 through 12. It is part of the Wilmington Area School District. Enrollment usually fluctuates between 450 and 500 students every year. The mascot of the school is a Greyhound. Many sports and extracurricular activities are offered in the school.

Description
The school educates students in 9th through 12th grades. Students reside in New Wilmington, Volant, Plain Grove, Pulaski, Washington, Wilmington Township (Lawrence County), and Wilmington Township (Mercer County). Total student enrollment is officially 455, usually fluctuating between 450 and 500. It is located at 350 Wood Street New Wilmington, PA 16142. It is a public school.

Awards and recognition
In July 2017, the District was awarded the distinction of a Google Reference District. Google for Education Reference Districts are districts that demonstrate excellence and thought leadership through the innovative use of technology, including G Suite for Education (formerly known as Google Apps for Education) and Chromebooks, to drive impact and positive learning outcomes.

In August, 2017, the Wilmington Area School District became the first district to become a 1:1 school in the tri-county area.  Each student is provided a mobile device to enhance learning and provide a modern education.

Faculty and staff
The high school's principal is Mr. Michael L. Wright.  32 teachers make up the faculty of the high school. The student-to-teacher ratio is about 14 to 1.

A psychologist and nurse are on staff, as is a guidance department. Specialists focus on students with special needs such as those who are gifted or  who have learning disabilities.

Dr. Jeffrey Matty is the Superintendent and Ms. Mary Ann Grubic who is the Special Education Supervisor.

Curriculum
Wilmington high school offers many classes for its many student's interests. Core classes, physical education, health, Advanced Placement (AP), and electives are offered. Also, special needs programs are offered.

Math, Language Arts, Social Studies, and Science fall under the core class subjects.

Math classes include:

 Pre Algebra
Algebra 1
 Learning Support Algebra 1
 Algebra 2
 Geometry
 Co teach Geometry
 Learning Support Geometry
 Statistics/Intro to Calculus (Weighted 5 percentage points)
 Pre-calculus (Weighted 5 percentage points)
Practical Applications of Math (Weighted 10 percentage points)

Language Arts classes include:

 English 9
 Honors English 9 (Weighted 5 percentage points)
 English 10 
 Honors English 10 (Weighted 5 percentage points)
 English 11
 Learning Support English 11
 Co teach English 11
English 12 
Complete Grammar, Usage, and Mechanics

Social Studies classes include:

 Civics 
 Honors Civics
 History 10
 Honors History 10
 World History 11

Science classes include:

 Biology 9
 Honors Biology 9 (Weighted 5 percentage points)
 Chemistry 1
Organic Chemistry
 Environmental Science
 General Science
 Physics (Weighted 5 percentage points)
Conceptual Science
Advanced Chemistry Applications

Physical education and health classes include:

Extracurricular activities
Students participate in many activities, including sports, marching band, Ambassadors club, key club, Future Business Leaders of America (FBLA), and Future Farmers of America (FFA), Choir, Women's Choir, Chamber Singers, Charity Club, Science Olympiad, Student Council, National Honor Society, and Students Working to Advance Technology (SWAT).

Football, volleyball, and basketball are popular team sports. Other sports include baseball, softball, soccer, tennis, track, cross-country, hockey, and wrestling. Also, there is a bocce team, offering students with special needs a chance to participate in sports.

The school newspaper is the Blue and Gold (named for the school colors). An annual yearbook is published as well.

Financial 
The budget is around 20 million dollars a year. 1% of this is from student tuition. About 1.1 million dollar is from federal. [[State funding is 5.7% for regular ed and 1.3% for special ed totaling to around 10.1 million dollars. Around 14,000 dollars is spent per pupil. The top salary is 70,900 per year and the average salary is $63,991 per year. There are 5.37 million dollars assigned and 2.2 million unassigned.

Sports 
There are teams for football, soccer, tennis, basketball, volleyball, golf, wrestling, hockey, track and field, baseball, cross country, bocce. The ranks are Football AA, girls & boys soccer A, Tennis AA, Golf AA, boys & girls basketball AA, baseball & softball AA. Boys Track & Field AA, cross country A,  volleyball AA. Information on these rankings can be found at PIAA.

Enrollment 
In the 2018–2019 school year there were a total of 371 students. In 9th grade there were 98 students, 10th grade had 101 students, 11th grade had 84 students and 12th grade had 88 students.

AP courses 
The AP classes that are available are AP Biology, AP Calculus, AP English, AP Gov, AP US History and these classes are weighted 10%. In 2018-2019 year there are 81 students taking AP courses.

Honors classes 
The honors classes include Honors English, Honors History and Advanced Biology. These classes are weighted by 5%.

Graduation requirements 
Graduation requirements[English 4 credits, Social Studies/History 4 credits, Science 3.5 Credits, Mathematics 3 credits, Arts & Humanities 1 credit, Physical Education 1.5 credits, Health 0.5 credits, Electives 10 credits, Keystone Proficiency, TOTAL 27.5 credits]

Board of Education 
The Wilmington Area School District is governed by nine elected members who serve as Directors on the Board of education.  Directors serve for multi-year terms without pay.

References

External links
Official website

Educational institutions in the United States with year of establishment missing
Public high schools in Pennsylvania
Schools in Lawrence County, Pennsylvania
1965 establishments in Pennsylvania